September 5 – Eastern Orthodox liturgical calendar – September 7

All fixed commemorations below are celebrated on September 19 by Eastern Orthodox Churches on the Old Calendar.

For September 6th, Orthodox Churches on the Old Calendar commemorate the Saints listed on August 24.

Saints
 Martyrs Romulus and 11,000 others, in Armenia (c. 107-115)
 Martyrs Cyriacus, Faustus, Abibus, and 11 others, at Alexandria (250)
 Martyrs Calodote, Macarius, Andrew, Cyriacus, Dionysius, Andrew the Soldier, Andropelagia, Thecla, Theoctistus, and Sarapabon the Senator, in Egypt (256)
 Hieromartyr Cyril, Bishop of Gortyna on Crete (c. 303)  (see also: June 14, July 9)
 Martyr Eudoxius, and with him Martyrs Zeno, Macarius, and 1,104 soldiers, in Melitene (311-312)
 Saint Archippus of Hierapolis (4th century)
 Saint David of Hermopolis in Egypt (6th century)

Pre-Schism Western saints
 Saints Augustine, Sanctian and Beata, born in Spain, martyred near Sens in France, where they were venerated (273)
 Saint Petronius, Bishop of Verona and Confessor  (c. 450)
 Saint Arator, fourth Bishop of Verdun in France (c. 460)
 Saint Maccallin (Macallan, Macculin Dus), Bishop of Lusk in Ireland, also venerated in Scotland (c. 497)
 Saints Donatian, Praesidius, Mansuetus, Germanus, Fusculus and Laetus, driven out of Africa into exile by Huneric the Arian King of the Vandals (5th century)
 Saint Eleutherius, Abbot of St Mark's Abbey in Spoleto, then a monk at San Gregorio Magno al Celio in Rome (c. 590)
 Saint Faustus, Abbot of the monastery of Santa Lucy in Syracuse in Sicily (c. 607)
 Saint Cagnoald (Chainoaldus, Cagnou), brother of St Faro and St Burgundofara, he became a monk at Luxeuil Abbey in France, and later the sixth Bishop of Laon (c. 635)
 Saint Beya (Bega, Begh, Bee), Virgin, first Abbess of Copeland in Cumbria (7th century)
 Saints Felix and Augebert, missionaries killed by pagans in Champagne (7th century)
 Saint Magnus of Füssen (Magnoaldus, Maginold, Mang), Enlightener of the Allgäu region of Germany (750-772)

Post-Schism Orthodox saints

New martyrs and confessors
 New Hieromartyr Maximus Sandovich, Priest, of Lemkovina, in the Carpathian Mountains (1914)
 New Hieromartyr Demetrius Spassky, Priest (1918)
 New Hieromartyrs John Pavlovsky and Vsevolod Poteminsky, Priests (1937)
 New Hieromartyr Constantine Bogoslovsky, Priest (1937)

Other commemorations
 Commemoration of the Miracle of the Archangel Michael at Colossae (Chonae) (4th century)
 Synaxis of the Archangel Michael at Nimborio (the commercial port) of Symi island, Greece.
 Synaxis of the Archangel Michael of Perimpliotis, on Symi island, Greece.
 Second Consecration of the Church of the Theotokos "in the home of St. Irene (or of St. Anne)".
 Icon of the Theotokos of Kiev-Bratsk (1654)  (see also: May 10)
 Icon of the Theotokos Arapet (Arabian).
 Repose of Ivan Yakovlevich Koreisha, Fool-for-Christ, of Moscow (1861)
 Repose of Archimandrite Paisius the New of Mount Athos (1871)

Icon gallery

Notes

References

Sources
 September 6/September 19. Orthodox Calendar (PRAVOSLAVIE.RU).
 September 19 / September 6. HOLY TRINITY RUSSIAN ORTHODOX CHURCH (A parish of the Patriarchate of Moscow).
 September 6. OCA - The Lives of the Saints.
 The Autonomous Orthodox Metropolia of Western Europe and the Americas (ROCOR). St. Hilarion Calendar of Saints for the year of our Lord 2004. St. Hilarion Press (Austin, TX). p. 66.
 The Sixth Day of the Month of September. Orthodoxy in China.
 September 6. Latin Saints of the Orthodox Patriarchate of Rome.
 The Roman Martyrology. Transl. by the Archbishop of Baltimore. Last Edition, According to the Copy Printed at Rome in 1914. Revised Edition, with the Imprimatur of His Eminence Cardinal Gibbons. Baltimore: John Murphy Company, 1916. pp. 273–274.
 Rev. Richard Stanton. A Menology of England and Wales, or, Brief Memorials of the Ancient British and English Saints Arranged According to the Calendar, Together with the Martyrs of the 16th and 17th Centuries. London: Burns & Oates, 1892. pp. 436–437.

 Greek Sources
 Great Synaxaristes:  6 ΣΕΠΤΕΜΒΡΙΟΥ. ΜΕΓΑΣ ΣΥΝΑΞΑΡΙΣΤΗΣ.
  Συναξαριστής. 6 Σεπτεμβρίου. ECCLESIA.GR. (H ΕΚΚΛΗΣΙΑ ΤΗΣ ΕΛΛΑΔΟΣ).
  06/09/. Ορθόδοξος Συναξαριστής.

 Russian Sources
  19 сентября (6 сентября). Православная Энциклопедия под редакцией Патриарха Московского и всея Руси Кирилла (электронная версия). (Orthodox Encyclopedia - Pravenc.ru).
  6 сентября по старому стилю  /  19 сентября по новому стилю. Русская Православная Церковь - Православный церковный календарь на  год.

September in the Eastern Orthodox calendar